Guy Canivet (born 23 September 1943 in Lons-le-Saunier) is a French judge.

, he is president of the Court of Cassation and as such is the highest judge in France.

On 22 February 2007, Jean-Louis Debré, president of the French National Assembly, appointed Guy Canivet to the Constitutional Council of France, replacing Jean-Claude Colliard.

References

1943 births
Living people
People from Lons-le-Saunier
Court of Cassation (France) judges
Chief justices
Commandeurs of the Légion d'honneur
21st-century French judges
Corresponding Fellows of the British Academy